The Duchess of Kent Hospital is a government hospital located around 3.2 kilometre from the town centre of Sandakan, Sabah, Malaysia. The hospital has an area around 42.93 acres, with the hospital buildings area comprising 2,245.3 square metres. The hospital is named after the British princess Marina, Duchess of Kent.

History 

The site of the current Duchess of Kent hospital was the former site for the old wooden building that was built by the British in 1900. During the World War II, the old building was destroyed by the Japanese Army attacks. After the war ended, a modern building was then constructed by the British in 1951. The building was officiated by Duchess of Kent Princess Marina on 20 October 1952 and named after her, before it was finally finished in 1953. Starting from 1996, the building undergoing more renovation with the addition of more buildings blocks, with a specialist building was construct in 1999, a storage building in 2001, a forensic building in 2002 and an additional building for hospital wards in 2007.

See also 
 List of hospitals in Malaysia

References

External links 
 
 

Hospital buildings completed in 1951
Hospitals in Sabah
Buildings and structures in Sandakan
20th-century architecture in Malaysia